Skärstad is a locality situated in Jönköping Municipality, Jönköping County, Sweden with 341 inhabitants in 2010.

References

External links 

Populated places in Jönköping Municipality